In Search Of Voodoo: Roots To Heaven is a 2018 Beninese biographical documentary film directed by the Hollywood actor Djimon Hounsou and co-produced by director himself with Eric McGaw. This is the directorial debut of Djimon Hounsou.

The film is based on true events in the life of actor Djimon Hounsou and focuses on personal, cultural, and spiritual vibrant tales of Voodoo, West Africa. The film received critical reviews from critics.

International screenings
 10 March 2018 – Miami International Film Festival (World premier)
 10 and 12 June 2018 – Zanzibar International Film Festival
 16 February 2019 – Toronto Black Film Festival
 9 February 2018 – Pan African Film Festival
 9 March 2019 – New African Film Festival

References

External links
 
 In Search of Voodoo: Roots to Heaven in YouTube

2018 films
Beninese documentary films
2018 documentary films
2010s English-language films